The 1979 season was the Minnesota Vikings' 19th in the National Football League. The Vikings finished with a 7–9 record, their first losing season since 1967, and missed the playoffs for the first time since 1972.

The loss of Fran Tarkenton to retirement in the off-season meant third-year quarterback Tommy Kramer became the starter. The season also marked the end of an era as the last remaining original Viking, longtime defensive end Jim Marshall, retired after 19 seasons with the Vikings and 20 in the NFL, having set league records for most consecutive games played (282) and consecutive starts (270). Counting playoff games, he had started in every one of the 289 games in Vikings history. Safety Paul Krause also retired after the season ended; he holds the league record with 81 career interceptions.

Offseason

1979 Draft

 The details of this forfeited pick are unknown.
 The Vikings traded their eighth-round selection (207th overall) to the Baltimore Colts in exchange for OT Frank Myers.
 The Vikings traded their 10th-round selection (263rd overall) and 1978 eighth-round selection (213th overall) to the New York Jets in exchange for S Phil Wise.

Roster

Preseason

Regular season

Schedule

Note: Intra-division opponents are in bold text.

Standings

Awards and records
 On September 2, WR Ahmad Rashad caught four touchdown passes, which remains a Vikings single-game record.
 On November 25, the team blocked four kicks – two extra point attempts, a field goal attempt and a punt by Tom Blanchard – against the Tampa Bay Buccaneers. This remains a franchise record.
 On December 16, RB Rickey Young caught 15 passes, a single-game franchise record.

Statistics

Team leaders

League rankings

References

Minnesota Vikings seasons
Minnesota
Minnesota Vikings